The rufous spinetail (Synallaxis unirufa) is a species of bird in the family Furnariidae. It is found in Colombia, Ecuador, Peru, and Venezuela. Its natural habitat is subtropical or tropical moist montane forests.

References

rufous spinetail
Birds of the Northern Andes
rufous spinetail
Taxonomy articles created by Polbot